The Institute of Science (formerly known as the Royal Institute of Science (RIS)) is an institution of postgraduate education and research located in Mumbai, India. It is managed by the Government of Maharashtra and is currently clustered from 2019 batch with the              Dr. Homi Bhabha State University. However, previously enrolled batch students will get their degree affiliated to the Mumbai University. It is accredited with an 'A' Grade by the National Assessment and Accreditation Council (NAAC) in March 2014.

Established in 1920, its research centers around all branches of science including Physics, Chemistry, Biology, Microbiology, Mathematics, Biochemistry, Bio-Technology and Environmental studies. In Maharashtra state and University of Mumbai, some programs like the Masters in biochemistry, were available only in the Institute of Science until recently. It offers M.Sc. and Ph.D. programs and currently does not offer undergraduate programs. Though the institute offers M.Sc. and Ph.D. programs of the University of Mumbai till 2018 enrolled batch  due to the autonomy granted to the institute, the admissions to these programs are managed separately by the institute but examinations are conducted by the Dr. Homi Bhabha State University (cluster).

'The Institute of Science, Mumbai' was founded by George Clarke, 1st Baron Sydenham of Combe. The institute's buildings were constructed using funds from private donations. Sir Cowasji Jehangir donated money for the institute's east wing. The construction of the west flank of the main building was paid for by Jacob Sassoon, and the east flank by Sir Currimbhoy Ebrahim, Bt. Vasanji Mulji donated funds for the library.

The foundation stone for the institute, designed by George Wittet, was laid in 1911. Completed in 1920, the building stands next to the Gothic structures of the Rajabai tower of University of Mumbai and the Elphinstone College.

Built in yellow Kharodi basalt stone from the district of Thane, this elegant, curving facades of the two wings, joined by the flat central dome of the Cowasji Jehangir Hall, manage to harmonize with the 19th century buildings surrounding it. Protected from the street by the many-arched facades are a botanical garden, herbarium and a park.
The Institute of Science is awarded the status of "College with potential for Excellence" by the UGC in 2009 and awarded generous grants for infrastructure development.

References

External links
 

University of Mumbai
Universities and colleges in Mumbai
Education in Mumbai
1920 establishments in India
Research institutes established in 1920